Adrien Duvillard may refer to:

 Adrien Duvillard (alpine skier born 1934) (1934–2017), French alpine skier
 Adrien Duvillard (alpine skier born 1969), French former alpine skier